NGC 10 is a spiral galaxy located in the southern constellation of Sculptor. It was discovered by John Herschel on 25 September 1834. Its morphological classification in the De Vaucouleurs system is SAB(rs)bc, where the 'SAB' denotes a weak-barred spiral, '(rs)' indicates a slight ring-like structure, and 'bc' means the spiral arms are moderately to loosely wound. Paturel et al. (2003) assigned this galaxy a classification of SBbc, indicating a barred spiral galaxy.

On 22 December 2011, a Type II supernova designated SN 2011jo was discovered in NGC 10 by Stuart Parker of New Zealand.

References

External links

 SEDS

Barred spiral galaxies
Sculptor (constellation)
0010
Galaxies discovered in 1835
18350924
Discoveries by John Herschel